Charles Archibald Wiles (11 August 1892 - 4 November 1957) was a cricketer who played one Test for West Indies in 1933.  

A useful middle-order batsman whose first-class career extended from 1920 to 1936, Archie Wiles remains the second-oldest Test debutant for West Indies.  He was 40 years and 345 days old when he appeared in the Second Test against England in 1933. He is surpassed in age only by Nelson Betancourt who was 42 years, 242 days old on his Test debut in 1930.  

In spite of some good performances with the bat in first-class cricket, Wiles failed when the big occasion came at Old Trafford in 1933, scoring just 0 and 2. Although he was born in Barbados, he played his domestic cricket for Trinidad in the Caribbean’s annual inter-colonial tournament.  During his career, he surpassed fifty runs in an innings on eight occasions, twice going on to make a century: in February 1925 he scored 110 against British Guiana at Port-of-Spain, Trinidad, and two years later scored 192 against Barbados at Bridgetown.  This game, a timeless match played over eight days, was remarkable insofar as despite Wiles's first innings total, which included a fourth-wicket partnership of 146 with Joe Small, and Trinidad’s first innings lead of 384, Barbados won by 146 runs (Barbados 175 and 726, Trinidad 559 and 217).

References

External links
 
 

1892 births
1957 deaths
West Indies Test cricketers
Barbadian cricketers
Trinidad and Tobago cricketers